The Spinning Heart is a social novel written by Irish novelist Donal Ryan. It was first published in 2012 by Penguin Random House. Steerforth Press published the US edition in 2013. It won the 2012 Irish Book Award for the Newcomer of the Year and Book of the Year. It won the 2013 Guardian First Book Award It also won the European Union Prize for Literature (Ireland) in 2015 It was longlisted for the 2013 Man Booker Prize and shortlisted for the International Dublin Literary Award in 2014. In 2016 it was voted Irish Book of the Decade in a poll run by Dublin Book Festival.

References 

2012 Irish novels
Novels by Donal Ryan
Transworld Publishers books